Glass catfish may mean:
 African glass catfish or Pareutropius debauwi, a species of fish in the family Schilbeidae
 Parailia somalensis or "Somalia glass catfish"
 Asian glass catfish or Kryptopterus, a genus of fish in the family Siluridae
 Kryptopterus bicirrhis or "glass catfish"
Kryptopterus vitreolus or "ghost catfish"